Florencia Raitzin-Legrand is an Argentine-born French pianist who resides in Paris. She has performed with the French National Orchestra and the Amadeus Quartet, and was invited to participate in Sviatoslav Richter's festival at La Grange de Meslay.

Autobiography 
Florencia Raitzin-Legrand wrote an autobiography, 'The Tropic Bird', under the name of Serena Leigh Dalban.

External links
Florencia Raitzin-Legrand's website
Florencia Raitzin-Legrand's biography

Argentine classical pianists
Argentine women pianists
21st-century French women classical pianists
Living people
Year of birth missing (living people)
Argentine emigrants to France